Pestalotiopsis microspora is a species of endophytic fungus capable of breaking down and digesting polyurethane. Originally identified in 1880  in fallen foliage of common ivy (Hedera helix) in Buenos Aires, it also causes leaf spot in Hypericum 'Hidcote' (Hypericum patulum) shrubs in Japan.

However, its polyurethane degradation activity was discovered only in the 2010s in two distinct P. microspora strains isolated from plant stems in the Yasuni National Forest within the Ecuadorian Amazon rainforest by a group of student researchers led by molecular biochemistry professor Scott Strobel as part of Yale's annual Rainforest Expedition and Laboratory. It is the first fungus species found to be able to subsist on polyurethane in anaerobic conditions. This makes the fungus a potential candidate for bioremediation projects involving large quantities of plastic.

Pestalotiopsis microspora was originally described from Buenos Aires, Argentina in 1880 by mycologist Carlo Luigi Spegazzini, who named it Pestalotia microspora.

In 1996 Julie C. Lee first isolated Torreyanic acid, a dimeric quinone, from P. microspora, and noted that the species is likely the cause of the decline of Florida torreya (Torreya taxifolia), an endangered species of a tree that is related to the paclitaxel-producing yew tree Taxus brevifolia.

See also
Organisms breaking down plastic
Aspergillus tubingensis, another fungus that can digest polyurethane
Ideonella sakaiensis, a bacterium capable of breaking down PET
Galleria mellonella, a caterpillar that can digest polyethylene

References

External links 

Index Fungorum
USDA ARS Fungal Database

microspora
Bioremediation
Fungi described in 1880
Organisms breaking down plastic